The Zimbabwe cricket team toured Sri Lanka in June and July 2017 to play one Test match and five One Day Internationals (ODIs). Originally, the schedule was for two Test matches and three ODIs. It was Zimbabwe's first tour to Sri Lanka since January 2002. All the matches were played as day games.

Zimbabwe won the ODI series 3–2, their first ever series win against Sri Lanka. It was their first away series win since 2009 and the first away series win against a Test nation since defeating Bangladesh in 2001. It was also Zimbabwe's first win in a five-match series away from home. Zimbabwe's captain, Graeme Cremer, said the victory was "the pinnacle of my career". In contrast, Sri Lanka's captain, Angelo Mathews, said the defeat was "one of the lowest points in my career" and stepped down as captain of the team in all three formats the following day. Dinesh Chandimal was later named as the new Test captain. Sri Lanka went on to win the one-off Test match by 4 wickets.

Squads

ODI series

1st ODI

2nd ODI

3rd ODI

4th ODI

5th ODI

Test match

Only Test

References

External links
 Series home at ESPN Cricinfo

2017 in Sri Lankan cricket
2017 in Zimbabwean cricket
International cricket competitions in 2017
Zimbabwean cricket tours of Sri Lanka